Tomás Xavier de Lima Teles da Silva, 1st Marquis of Ponte de Lima, 13th Count of Vila Nova de Cerveira (12 October 1727 — 23 December 1800), was a Portuguese nobleman, statesman, and historian.

Career 
Tomás Xavier de Lima Teles da Silva was a Fidalgo of the Royal Household of Maria I of Portugal and a knight of the Order of Christ.

He served as the head of the Portuguese government from 1786 to 1788.

18th-century Portuguese people
People from Lisbon
Portuguese nobility
Portuguese Roman Catholics
1727 births
1800 deaths